The 2004 Holy Cross Crusaders football team was an American football team that represented the College of the Holy Cross during the 2004 NCAA Division I-AA football season. Holy Cross finished second-to-last in the Patriot League. 

In their first year under head coach Tom Gilmore, the Crusaders compiled a 3–8 record. David Mitchell and Steve Silva were the team captains.

The Crusaders were outscored 367 to 240. Their 1–5 conference record placed sixth in the seven-team Patriot League standings. 

Holy Cross played its home games at Fitton Field on the college campus in Worcester, Massachusetts.

Schedule

References

Holy Cross
Holy Cross Crusaders football seasons
Holy Cross Crusaders football